The 1990 ICF World Junior Canoe Slalom Championships were the 3rd edition of the ICF World Junior Canoe Slalom Championships. The event took place in Tavanasa, Switzerland from 13 to 22 July 1990 under the auspices of the International Canoe Federation (ICF).

Seven medal events took place. The C2 team event was not held. It was the first time that team events were part of the world junior championships.

Medal summary

Men

Canoe

Kayak

Women

Kayak

Medal table

References

External links
International Canoe Federation

ICF World Junior Canoe Slalom Championships
ICF World Junior and U23 Canoe Slalom Championships